Omar Bendriss (born 25 May 1984) is a Moroccan footballer. He usually plays as defender. Bendriss is currently attached to FAR Rabat.

Bendriss played for the Morocco national under-20 football team in the 2003 African Youth Championship.

References

1984 births
Living people
Footballers from Rabat
Moroccan footballers
AS FAR (football) players
Morocco under-20 international footballers
Association football defenders